Arashiyama Station (嵐山駅) is the name of two train stations in Japan:

 Arashiyama Station (Keifuku) in Ukyō-ku, Kyoto
 Arashiyama Station (Hankyu) in Nishikyō-ku, Kyoto